Dirgantara Mandala Museum, officially known as the Central Museum of Indonesian Air Force "Dirgantara Mandala" is a central museum of the Indonesian Air Force. The museum displays historical exhibits related to the history of the Indonesian Air Force. The museum is located in the complex of Adisutjipto International Airport in Bantul Regency, Yogyakarta, Indonesia. Dirgantara Mandala Museum has a comprehensive collection of aviation in Indonesia, from early biplanes to modern jet engines.

History
The museum for the Indonesian Air Force was first established on April 4, 1969. The first location of the museum of the Indonesian Air Force was at Jalan Tanah Abang Bukit in Jakarta. The inauguration of the first museum was by Chief of Staff of the Indonesian Air Force, marhsal Roesmin Noerjadin. On July 29, 1978, the museum was relocated to a building of Kesatrian AKABRI Bagian Udara in Yogyakarta. The reason of the transfer of location was because Yogyakarta was considered as an important place where the Indonesian Air Force was born as well as the center for Indonesian Air Force-related activities. Later, because of the expanding collection of the museum, especially with the development of new military aircraft, the museum was planned to be relocated again.

For the new location of the museum, the officials of the Indonesian Air Force chose a building of a former sugar factory located in the complex of the Adisutjipto airstrip complex. During the Japanese occupation period, this building was used as a logistic warehouse. On December 17, 1982, the Chief of Staff of the Indonesian Air Force, marshal Ashadi Tjahjadi signed a plaque for the establishment of the new Indonesian Air Force museum. On April 11, 1984, the instruction to rehabilitate the former sugar warehouse into a museum was released. The construction of the Dirgantara Mandala museum was completed in the same year. On July 29, 1984, the new Dirgantara Mandala Museum was inaugurated by marshal Sukardi.

Museum and collection

The museum is divided into several rooms. The museum houses about 1,159 Indonesian aviation-related items.

The museum houses a collection of historic photographs related to the development of the Indonesian Air Force. There are a number of military aircraft and their replicas in the museum, mostly from the time of World War II and the Indonesian War for Independence. Among the notable collections are Nakajima Ki-43, Consolidated PBY Catalina, a replica of the WEL-I RI-X (the first produced Indonesian Aerospace), the Japanese A6M5 Zero Sen, some bombers (e.g. B-25 Mitchell, A-26 Invader, TU-16 Badger), some Cold War era of fighters such as Lavochkin La-11, CS-102 (Czech-built Mikoyan-Gurevich MiG-15UTI), Mikoyan-Gurevich MiG-17PF F-1182 and PZL-Mielec Lim-5 F-1160, Mikoyan-Gurevich MiG-19S, Mikoyan-Gurevich MiG-21F-13, CAC Sabre, Northrop F-5, Douglas A-4E,  North American P-51 Mustang (known popularly in Indonesia si Cocor Merah), a number of gliders, the helicopter Hiller Model 360 (the first helicopter which was used by Sukarno as presidential helicopter) and missiles.

In 2015, the museum houses a prototype of nine bombs designed by the Indonesian Air Force in cooperation with the state-owned enterprises Pindad and Sari Bahari who specializes in military and commercial products. These are practice bombs and high explosive bombs which are used for the Indonesian Air Force's aircraft such as Sukhoi Su-30, F-16, F-5, Sky Hawk, and Super Tucano, etc.

See also

Satriamandala Museum
List of museums and cultural institutions in Indonesia

References

Further reading

Museums in Yogyakarta
Buildings and structures in the Special Region of Yogyakarta